Dashti-ye Hoseyn Aqa (also Romanized as Dashtī-ye Ḩoseynā Āqā) is a village in Lalar and Katak Rural District, Chelo District, Andika County, Khuzestan Province, Iran. At the 2006 census, its population was 106, in 19 families.

References 

Populated places in Andika County